Charles Rowley may refer to:

Baronets
 Sir Charles Rowley, 1st Baronet (1770–1845), Royal Navy officer
 Sir Charles Robert Rowley, 4th Baronet (1800–1888), see Rowley baronets
 Sir Charles Samuel Rowley, 6th Baronet (1891–1962), see Rowley baronets
Sir Charles Rowley, 2nd Baronet (1801–1884), son of Sir Charles Rowley, 1st Baronet
 Sir Charles Robert Rowley, 7th Baronet, 8th Baronet (1926–2008), succeeded as eighth Baronet of Tendring Hall in 1997, see Rowley baronets

Others
 Charles Rowley (socialist) (1839–1933), socialist and councillor of Ancoats
 Charles Rowley (cricketer) (1849–1933), English cricketer
Charles Rowley (academic) (1906–1985), Australian academic and public servant